is a Japanese film director.

Filmography

Film

TV series

References

External links
 
 

1981 births
Japanese film directors
Japanese television directors
Living people
People from Fukushima Prefecture
People from Kōriyama
21st-century Japanese people